"Me Niego" ("I refuse") is a song by Mexican band Reik featuring Puerto Rican singers Ozuna and Wisin. It was released on February 16, 2018 as the lead single off the band's sixth studio album, Ahora. The song was written by Reik members Jesús Navarro, Julio Ramírez, Gilberto Marín Espinoza, as well as Ozuna, Wisin, and "Los Legendarios" duo Christian Linares and Víctor Torres. Topping the charts in Bolivia, Colombia, Costa Rica, Guatemala, El Salvador, and Mexico, it also served as the theme song to the Mexican telenovela Tenías que ser tú, which starred Ariadne Díaz and Andrés Palacios. 

"Me Niego" marks the first time that Reik has recorded a reggaeton song, as they are famous for their pop rock ballads. It is the group's first single to enter the Billboard Hot 100.

Background and release
According to Reik's lead singer Jesús Navarro, "[he] was one of those people who are afraid of change", and he stated that "as Pop artists, we should learn from Urban singers, they're always helping each other, without envy or anything like that". Fellow member Gilberto Marín commented that "Sometimes, experimenting with different things and styles will take us away from what people would expect from us, what Reik usually does, but at the same time it defines that our sound is more universal".

As Reik's members were working on the song, Ozuna heard it and wanted to participate on it, as did Wisin later on.

Music video
The music video for the song, directed by Nuno Gómez, was filmed in Miami, Florida, US. It was released on February 16, 2018. The man of the video is the venezuelan actor Carlos Felipe Alvarez and the girl is the also Venezuelan actress Ornella de la Rosa. As a curiosity, they were both partners in real life at the time of shooting the video..

Track listings
Digital download
"Me Niego (featuring Ozuna and Wisin)" – 3:42

Digital download –  Pop version
"Me Niego (featuring Ozuna and Wisin)" – 4:13

Digital download – Solo Pop version
"Me Niego" – 3:29

Charts

Weekly charts

Year-end charts

Certifications

Release history

See also
List of number-one songs of 2018 (Bolivia)
List of number-one songs of 2018 (Colombia)
List of number-one songs of 2018 (Guatemala)
List of number-one songs of 2018 (Mexico)
 List of airplay number-one hits of the 2010s (Argentina)
 List of Billboard Argentina Hot 100 top-ten singles in 2018
List of Billboard number-one Latin songs of 2018

References

2018 singles
2018 songs
Reik songs
Wisin songs
Reggaeton songs
Songs written by Julio Ramírez
Ozuna (singer) songs
Sony Music Mexico singles
Songs written by Wisin
Songs written by Ozuna (singer)